Corrao is a surname. Notable people with the surname include:

Angelo Corrao, Italian-American film and television editor
Ignazio Corrao (born 1984), Italian politician
Lauren Corrao, American television executive
Ludovico Corrao (1927–2011), Italian politician and lawyer